Organix may refer to:

Business
Organix Ltd., a UK baby food company founded by Lizzie Vann
Organix Inc., a US pharmaceutical company, developers of drugs such as Tropoxane

Entertainment
Organix (album), a 1993 album by The Roots
"Organix", a song by Optimus Rhyme on the album Optimus Rhyme

See also
 Organic (disambiguation)